Breadfruit (Artocarpus altilis) is a species of flowering tree in the mulberry and jackfruit family (Moraceae) believed to be a domesticated descendant of Artocarpus camansi originating in New Guinea, the Maluku Islands, and the Philippines. It was initially spread to Oceania via the Austronesian expansion. It was further spread to other tropical regions of the world during the Colonial Era. British and French navigators introduced a few Polynesian seedless varieties to Caribbean islands during the late 18th century. Today it is grown in some 90 countries throughout South and Southeast Asia, the Pacific Ocean, the Caribbean, Central America and Africa. Its name is derived from the texture of the moderately ripe fruit when cooked, similar to freshly baked bread and having a potato-like flavor.

The trees have been widely planted in tropical regions, including lowland Central America, northern South America, and the Caribbean. In addition to the fruit serving as a staple food in many cultures, the light, sturdy timber of breadfruit has been used for outriggers, ships, and houses in the tropics.

Breadfruit is closely related to Artocarpus camansi (breadnut or seeded breadfruit) of New Guinea, the Maluku Islands, and the Philippines, Artocarpus blancoi (tipolo or antipolo) of the Philippines, and Artocarpus mariannensis (dugdug) of Micronesia, all of which are sometimes also referred to as "breadfruit". It is also closely related to the jackfruit.

Description 

The large and thick leaves are deeply cut into pinnate lobes. All parts of the tree yield latex, which is useful for boat caulking.

The trees are monoecious, with male and female flowers growing on the same tree. The male flowers emerge first, followed shortly afterward by the female flowers. The latter grow into capitula, which are capable of pollination just three days later. Pollination occurs mainly by fruit bats, but cultivated varieties produce fruit without pollination. The compound, false fruit develops from the swollen perianth, and originates from 1,500 to 2,000 flowers visible on the skin of the fruit as hexagon-like disks.

Breadfruit is one of the highest-yielding food plants, with a single tree producing up to 200 or more grapefruit-sized fruits per season, requiring limited care. In the South Pacific, the trees yield 50 to 150 fruits per year, usually round, oval or oblong weighing . Productivity varies between wet and dry areas. The ovoid fruit has a rough surface, and each fruit is divided into many achenes, each achene surrounded by a fleshy perianth and growing on a fleshy receptacle. Most selectively bred cultivars have seedless fruit, whereas seeded varieties are grown mainly for their edible seeds. Breadfruit is usually propagated using root cuttings.

Breadfruit is closely related to the breadnut. It is similar in appearance to its relative of the same genus, the jackfruit (Artocarpus heterophyllus).

Breadfruit has hundreds of varieties and thousands of common names varying according to its geographic distribution, and is cultivated in some 90 countries.

The closely related Artocarpus camansi can be distinguished from A. altilis by having spinier fruits with numerous seeds. Artocarpus mariannensis can be distinguished by having dark green elongated fruits with darker yellow flesh, as well as entire or shallowly lobed leaves.

Propagation 
Breadfruit is propagated mainly by seeds, although seedless breadfruit can be propagated by transplanting suckers that grow off the surface roots of the tree. The roots can be purposefully injured to induce the growth of suckers, which are then separated from the root and planted in a pot or directly transplanted into the ground. Pruning also induces sucker growth. Sucker cuttings are placed in plastic bags containing a mixture of soil, peat and sand, and kept in the shade while moistened with liquid fertilizer. When roots are developed, the transplant is put in full sun until time for planting in the orchard.

Taxonomy 

According to DNA fingerprinting studies, the wild seeded ancestor of breadfruit is the breadnut (Artocarpus camansi) which is native to New Guinea, the Maluku Islands, and the Philippines. It was one of the canoe plants spread by Austronesian voyagers around 3,000 years ago into Micronesia, Melanesia, and Polynesia, where it was not native.

A. camansi was domesticated and selectively bred in Polynesia, giving rise to the mostly seedless Artocarpus altilis. Micronesian breadfruit also show evidence of hybridization with the native Artocarpus mariannensis, while most Polynesian and Melanesian cultivars do not. This indicates that Micronesia was initially colonized separately from Polynesia and Melanesia through two different migration events which later came into contact with each other in eastern Micronesia.

Distribution and habitat 

Breadfruit is an equatorial lowland species. It has been spread from its Pacific source to many tropical regions.

In 1769, Joseph Banks was stationed in Tahiti as part of the  expedition commanded by Captain James Cook. The late-18th-century quest for cheap, high-energy food sources for slaves in British colonies prompted colonial administrators and plantation owners to call for breadfruit to be brought to the Caribbean. As president of the Royal Society, Banks provided a cash bounty and gold medal for success in this endeavor, and successfully lobbied for a British Naval expedition.

Preferred soils are neutral to alkaline (pH of 6.1–7.4) and either sand, sandy loam, loam or sandy clay loam. Breadfruit is able to grow in coral sands and saline soils.

Nutrition

Breadfruit is 71% water, 27% carbohydrates, 1% protein and negligible in fat (see table). In a 100 gram amount, raw breadfruit is a rich source (35% of the Daily Value, DV) of vitamin C, and a moderate source (10% DV each) of thiamin and potassium, with no other nutrients in significant content.

Uses

Food

Breadfruit is a staple food in many tropical regions. Most breadfruit varieties produce fruit throughout the year. Both ripe and unripe fruit have culinary uses; unripe breadfruit is cooked before consumption. Before being eaten, the fruit are roasted, baked, fried or boiled. When cooked, the taste of moderately ripe breadfruit is described as potato-like, or similar to freshly baked bread.

One breadfruit tree can produce  each season. Because breadfruit trees usually produce large crops at certain times of the year, preservation of harvested fruit is an issue. One traditional preservation technique is to bury peeled and washed fruits in a leaf-lined pit where they ferment over several weeks and produce a sour, sticky paste. So stored, the product may endure a year or more, and some pits are reported to have produced edible contents more than 20 years later. 

In addition to being edible raw, breadfruit can be ground into flour and the seeds can be cooked for consumption.

Southeast Asia and Pacific Islands

The seedless breadfruit is found in Brunei, Indonesia and Malaysia, where it is called . It is commonly made into fritters and eaten as snacks. Breadfruit fritters are sold as local street food.

It is also called  (also spelled ), along with the closely related Artocarpus camansi, and the endemic Artocarpus blancoi ( or ). All three species, as well as the closely related jackfruit, are commonly used much in the same way in savory dishes.

In the Hawaiian staple food called , the traditional ingredient of mashed taro root can be replaced by, or augmented with, mashed breadfruit. The resulting "breadfruit poi" is called .

South Asia

In Sri Lanka, it is cooked as a curry using coconut milk and spices (which becomes a side dish) or boiled. Boiled breadfruit is a famous main meal. It is often consumed with scraped coconut or coconut sambol, made of scraped coconut, red chili powder and salt mixed with a dash of lime juice. A traditional sweet snack made of finely sliced, sun-dried breadfruit chips deep-fried in coconut oil and dipped in heated treacle or sugar syrup is known as rata del petti. In India, fritters of breadfruit, called jeev kadge phodi in Konkani or kadachakka varuthath in Malayalam are a local delicacy in coastal Karnataka and Kerala. In Seychelles, it was traditionally eaten as a substitute for rice, as an accompaniment to the mains. It would either be consumed boiled (friyapen bwi) or grilled (friyapen griye), where it would be put whole in the wood fire used for cooking the main meal and then taken out when ready. It is also eaten as a dessert, called ladob friyapen, where it is boiled in coconut milk, sugar, vanilla, cinnamon and a pinch of salt.

Caribbean and Latin America

In Belize, the Mayan people call it masapan. 

In Puerto Rico, breadfruit is called panapén or pana, for short, although the name pana is often used to refer to breadnut, seeds of which have traditionally been boiled, peeled and eaten whole. In some inland regions it is also called mapén and used to make pasteles and alcapurrias. Breadfruit is often served boiled with a mixture of sauteed bacalao (salted cod fish), olive oil and onions. Mostly as tostones where about 1 inch chunks are fried, lighty flattered and fried again. Mofongo de panapén fried breadfruit mashed with olive oil, garlic, broth, and chicharrón. Rellenos de panapén the breadfruit version of papa rellena. Dipping sauce made from boiled ripe breadfruit similar to chutney using spices, sesame seeds, herbs, lentil, coconut milk, and fruit. Both ripe and unripe are boiled together and mashed with milk and butter to make pastelón de panapén, a dish similar to lasagna. Ripe breadfruit is used in desserts: flan de pana (breadfruit custard). Cazuela, a crustless pie with ripe breadfruit, spices, raisins, coconut milk,  and sweet potatoes. Breadfruit flour is sold all over Puerto Rico and used for making bread, pastries, cookies, pancakes, waffles, crepes, and almojábana.  

In the Dominican Republic, it is called buen pan or "good bread". Breadfruit isn't popular in Dominican cookery and is used mainly for feeding pigs. 

In Barbados, breadfruit is boiled with salted meat and mashed with butter to make breadfruit coucou. It is usually eaten with saucy meat dishes. 

In Trinidad and Tobago, breadfruit is boiled, then fried and eaten with saucy meat dishes like curried duck.

In Jamaica, breadfruit is boiled in soups or roasted on stove top, in the oven or on wood coal. It is eaten with the national dish ackee and salt fish. The ripe fruit is used in salads or fried as a side dish.

Timber and other uses

Breadfruit was widely used in a variety of ways among Pacific Islanders. Its lightweight wood (specific gravity of 0.27) is resistant to termites and shipworms, so it is used as timber for structures and outrigger canoes. Its wood pulp can also be used to make paper, called breadfruit tapa. Native Hawaiians used its sticky latex to trap birds, whose feathers were made into cloaks. The wood of the breadfruit tree was one of the most valuable timbers in the construction of traditional houses in Samoan architecture.

Breadfruit contains phytochemicals having potential as an insect repellent. The parts of the fruits that are discarded can be used to feed livestock. The leaves of breadfruit trees can also be browsed by cattle.

In culture 

On Puluwat in the Caroline Islands, in the context of sacred yitang lore, breadfruit (poi) is a figure of speech for knowledge. This lore is organized into five categories: war, magic, meetings, navigation, and breadfruit.

According to an etiological Hawaiian myth, the breadfruit originated from the sacrifice of the war god Kū. After deciding to live secretly among mortals as a farmer, Kū married and had children. He and his family lived happily until a famine seized their island. When he could no longer bear to watch his children suffer, Kū told his wife that he could deliver them from starvation, but to do so he would have to leave them. Reluctantly she agreed, and at her word, Kū descended into the ground right where he had stood until only the top of his head was visible. His family waited around the spot he had last been, day and night, watering it with their tears until suddenly, a small green shoot appeared where Kū had stood. Quickly, the shoot grew into a tall and leafy tree that was laden with heavy breadfruits that Kū's family and neighbors gratefully ate, joyfully saved from starvation.

Though they are widely distributed throughout the Pacific, many breadfruit hybrids and cultivars are seedless or otherwise biologically incapable of naturally dispersing long distances. Therefore, it is clear that humans aided distribution of the plant in the Pacific, specifically prehistoric groups who colonized the Pacific Islands. To investigate the patterns of human migration throughout the Pacific, scientists have used molecular dating of breadfruit hybrids and cultivars in concert with anthropological data. Results support the west-to-east migration hypothesis, in which the Lapita people are thought to have traveled from Melanesia to numerous Polynesian islands.

The world's largest collection of breadfruit varieties was established by botanist Diane Ragone, from over 20 years' travel to 50 Pacific islands, on a  plot outside of Hana, on the isolated east coast of Maui (Hawaii).

Gallery

See also 

 Breadnut (Artocarpus camansi)
 Cempedak (Artocarpus integer)
 Jackfruit (Artocarpus heterophyllus)
 Treculia – known as African breadfruit

References

External links 

 Breadfruit Institute

Artocarpus
Crops originating from Asia
Crops originating from the Pacific
Edible fruits
Flora of Malesia
Flora of Melanesia
Flora of Papuasia
Flora of Polynesia
Flora of the Southwestern Pacific
Fruit trees
Fruit vegetables
Hawaiian cuisine
Jamaican cuisine
Oceanian cuisine
Polynesian cuisine
Staple foods
Tropical agriculture
Tropical fruit
Barbadian cuisine
Belizean cuisine